Emily Molnar  is a Canadian dancer. Maclean's magazine featured her as one of Canada's "new generation of ballet sensations". Since July 2009, she has worked as the artistic director of Ballet BC. A graduate of The National Ballet School of Canada, Molnar is a former member of the National Ballet of Canada; Frankfurt Ballet. There she created and performed an extensive Ballet repertoire under director William Forsythe; and principal dancer with Ballet BC. 

Molnar is an internationally critically acclaimed artist who has worked and toured extensively throughout Europe, Asia, Mexico, Canada and the US. She has created and performed several works as a choreographer and solo artist. These include commissions for Alberta Ballet, Ballet Mannheim, Ballet Augsburg, Ballet BC, Cedar Lake Dance, Pro Arte Danza, and Morphoses/The Wheeldon Company. 

As an active mentor, advocate, and a coach, Molnar has, nurtured many artists and choreographers. She has educated and supported the research and development of dance and artistic leadership. In 2016, Molnar was appointed into the Order of Canada with the grade of member, one of Canada's highest civilian honours.

In 2020, Molnar became artistic director Nederlands Dans Theater.

References

External links
 Ballet BC

Canadian choreographers
Canadian ballerinas
Canadian female dancers
Living people
Year of birth missing (living people)
Members of the Order of Canada
Canadian women choreographers